The 1983–84 Washington State Cougars men's basketball team represented Washington State University for the 1983–84 NCAA Division I men's basketball season. Led by first-year head coach Len Stevens, the Cougars were members of the Pacific-10 Conference and played their home games on campus at Beasley Coliseum in Pullman, Washington.

There was no conference tournament this season; it debuted three years later.

As they had two years earlier, WSU hosted the first two rounds in the West regional of the 53-team NCAA tournament at Beasley Coliseum. This was the third and most recent NCAA Tournament in Pullman; the Spokane Arena opened in 1995 and has hosted several times.

The court surface at Beasley Coliseum was tartan (polyurethane) for its first decade; a traditional hardwood floor debuted at the start of this season.

References

External links
Sports Reference – Washington State Cougars: 1983–84 basketball season

Washington State Cougars men's basketball seasons
Washington State Cougars
Washington State
Washington State